The Royal Air Force strategic bombing campaign against Germany was waged by Bomber Command for five years. The vast majority of these sorties were flown at night. After suffering heavy losses attempting daylight bombing raids over the Heligoland islands in the North Sea and over France during the first half of 1940, Bomber Command had largely withdrawn its aircraft from daylight attacks. Bomber Command, however, was still willing to risk aircraft to attack targets in daylight on occasion. These were usually targets that required highly precise delivery of bombs, such as warships or small factories. Industries located in occupied territories were another group of targets that required a high degree of accuracy when attacked to avoid casualties among the civilians of the occupied country.

In addition, after winning the Battle of Britain, Fighter Command went over onto the offensive. Fighter Command conducted provocative missions in what they termed the "Circus" operations. These missions were various fighter sweeps over northern France and Belgium conducted to engage the Luftwaffe. The Ramrod type raid was a Circus offensive operation where a small number of bombers were escorted to a target with a very large fighter escort. Bomber Command supported the effort by assigning  No. 2 Group to work with Fighter Command.  No. 2 Group squadrons were equipped with faster, more manoeuvrable medium bombers, and as a group it was set apart for conducting daylight raids against near targets. Except for occasional diversionary efforts, No. 2 Group did not participate in the Bomber Offensive over Germany.

Missions

After the Allied invasion of the continent Allied control of the airspace over Europe was widespread, and daylight raids became much more common for Bomber Command crews. These later missions are not included in the above list.

References

Bibliography

 
 
 

Aerial operations and battles of World War II involving the United Kingdom